Alyce Frank is an American landscape painter.

Early life
Frank was born in New Iberia, Louisiana, in 1932. She then moved to Los Angeles and Tulsa at a young age. At the age of 15, she applied to a liberal arts program and was accepted at the University of Chicago, graduating three years later, in 1950. She then moved to Los Angeles, where she attended graduate school at UCLA and the University of Southern California (USC). At USC she met Larry Frank, an aspiring filmmaker; they married in 1953.

For ten years, she worked on educational films that her husband produced. Her work as a film editor helped cultivate her sense of composition, something that served her well when she took up painting.

Career 
She moved to New Mexico in 1962 and began painting in 1973, specializing in boldly colored landscape paintings influenced by fauvism and German expressionism.

In 1983, she was selected for a master class with Richard Diebenkorn at the Santa Fe Institute of Art.

Frank collaborates with many artists in nearby Taos, New Mexico, and refers to herself as a "Taos Expressionist". She is a long-time painting partner of Taos artist Barbara Zaring. 

Over 26 years, she created a large body of work, completing more than 600 canvases, primarily large landscapes as well as nearly one hundred portraits. Her works were collected into the book The Magical Realism of Alyce Frank by Joseph Dispenza in 1999.

Her painting The Upper Falls at Yosemite (ca. 1996) was part of an exhibition on the art of Yosemite which appeared at the Autry National Center, the Oakland Museum of California, the Nevada Museum of Art and the Eiteljorg Museum of American Indians and Western Art from 2006 to 2008.

Personal life 
She is a resident of Arroyo Hondo, New Mexico, and was married to Larry Frank, a filmmaker and author, until his death. They collected Native American and Hispano American art and artifacts. They had three children.

References

1932 births
Living people
20th-century American women artists
American women painters
Artists from Louisiana
Painters from New Mexico
University of California, Los Angeles alumni
University of Chicago alumni
University of Southern California alumni
People from New Iberia, Louisiana
21st-century American women artists